Vahur Sova (born 9 April 1956, in Suure-Jaani) is an Estonian architect.

Vahur Sova studied in the Tallinn Art University (today's Estonian Academy of Arts) in the department of architecture. He graduated from the institute in 1992.

Vahur Sova works in the architectural bureau Teigar ja Sova Arhitektid OÜ.

Major part of works by Vahur Sova are single-family homes. Notable public buildings by Vahur Sova are the Zeppelin Center in Tartu and the Pargi kindergarten in Viimsi. Vahur Sova is a member of the Union of Estonian Architects.

Works
Single-family home on Tuule Street
Single-family home on Vaalu Street
Single-family home on Hiieotsa Road
Apartment building in Jüri
Single-family home on Merirahu Street
Single-family home on Kapteni Street
Pargi Kindergarten in Viimsi
Zeppelin Center in Tartu

See also
List of Estonian architects

References
Union of Estonian Architects, members
Architectural Bureau Teigar Ja Sova Arhitektid OÜ, works

1956 births
Living people
People from Suure-Jaani
Estonian architects
Estonian Academy of Arts alumni